The Meadowcroft Chinook is a two-seat mid-winged American homebuilt aircraft design first flown in 1958.

Development
The Chinook was designed for maximum stability on the ground and the air with a roomy cockpit.

Design
The wing was patterned from the Ace Baby Ace homebuilt. The aircraft is a tricycle geared side-by-side seat mid-winged aircraft with a steeply raked windscreen. Each wing is braced with two small wing struts attached to the lower fuselage. The low rudder is capped with a strut braced horizontal stabilizer in a T-tail arrangement. The main gear is sourced from a Cessna 140. The aircraft can be reconfigured to be towed on its main gear by a vehicle.

Specifications (Meadowcroft Chinook)

References

Homebuilt aircraft